"Save It for a Rainy Day" is a song by American singer/songwriter Stephen Bishop. The song was the first of two hit singles from his debut album, Careless. It features a guitar solo by Eric Clapton and Chaka Khan on backing vocals toward the close of the song. 

"Save It for a Rainy Day" peaked at number 22 on the U.S. Billboard Hot 100 and number 21 on the Cash Box Top 100.  In Canada, the song peaked at number 20.

The song was a bigger Adult Contemporary hit, peaking at number six in the U.S. and number eight in Canada.

Chart performance

Weekly charts

Year-end charts

Personnel 
 Stephen Bishop – lead vocals, acoustic guitar
 John Barlow Jarvis – acoustic piano, electric piano
 Eric Clapton – rhythm electric guitar, lead guitar solo 
 Jeff Staton Jones – rhythm electric guitar, bass 
 Russ Kunkel – drums
 Ian Freebairn-Smith – horn arrangements
 Chaka Khan – backing vocals

References

External links
  

1976 songs
1977 debut singles
Stephen Bishop (singer) songs
ABC Records singles
Songs written by Stephen Bishop (singer)